Ecos or ECOS may refer to:

 Écos, a commune in Eure department, France
 eCos, an operating system
 ECOS (BANC magazine), published by the British Association of Nature Conservationists
 ECOS (CSIRO magazine), published by the Australian Commonwealth Scientific and Industrial Research Organisation
 European Conodont Symposia

See also 
 Eco (disambiguation)